Notodonta ziczac, the pebble prominent, is a moth of the family Notodontidae. It is found in Europe ranging to Central Asia.

Description
The wingspan is 40–45 mm. Their forewings are light grey on the front edge, the inner portion of the wing is cinnamon-brown. In the grey area is a roundish dark grey stain shaped like a pebble bounded proximally by a dark curved line. There is a dark, curved postmedian line towards the apex of the wing. The hindwings are grey, darker grey in the females. They have a dark, discal lunule. The thorax and abdomen are dark brown and thickly clothed with hair. The moth flies from April to September depending on the location.

The larvae feed on poplar, primarily aspen (Populus tremula) and willow.

References

Further reading
 South R. (1907) The Moths of the British Isles,  (First Series), Frederick Warne & Co. Ltd.,  London & NY: 359 pp. online

External links

Pebble prominent on UKmoths
Fauna Europaea
Lepidoptera of Belgium
Lepiforum.de
Vlindernet.nl 

Notodontidae
Moths described in 1758
Moths of Europe
Moths of Asia
Taxa named by Carl Linnaeus